The Rotary Lombardi Award is an award for college football in the United States. Awarded by the Rotary Club of Houston, Texas annually to the college football player "who best embodies the values and spirit of NFL's legendary coach Vince Lombardi" the Rotary Lombardi Award program was created in 1970 shortly after the death of Lombardi. The committee outlined the original criteria for eligibility for the award, which remained in place until this day:

History 
Following the death of highly regarded football coach Vince Lombardi in 1970 his widow, Marie, authorised the Rotary Club of Houston to establish the Rotary Lombardi Award. The award began as recognition to only interior line positions that Vince Lombardi played while an undergraduate at Fordham University, offensive and defensive guard, and later expanded to include linebackers and tight ends, with the addition of including non-performance values: leadership, courage, desire, respect for authority, and discipline. 

To be considered for the award, players must be a NCAA FBS College Football team member and meet the following qualifications:

 Be a down Lineman, end to end, either on offense or defense, setting up no further than ten (10) yards to the left or right of the ball at the time of the snap.
 Be a Linebacker on defense, setting up no further than five (5) yards deep from the line of scrimmage. 
 Must not come out of the offensive backfield and set up on the line of scrimmage as a Blocker or a Receiver or listed in the program as an Offensive Back or Receiver.
 Be eligible to participate in the current season.

The voting electorate is made up of the head coaches from all NCAA Division I schools, sports media personnel from across the country, and former winners and finalists of the Lombardi Award. The total number of voters is approximately 500. The Ohio State University holds the record for most Lombardi awards with six. Orlando Pace, the only two-time winner (1995 and 1996), is the most recent offensive lineman to be honored.

Net proceeds from the award activities are contributed to cancer research, awareness, and treatment, on the stipulation of Marie Lombardi.

Expansion of candidates, then retraction 
In 2017, the presenting Rotary Club expanded the award's eligibility to include all positions. This lasted until 2021, when they  reverted to the original criteria. The winners from 2017 through 2020 are not recognized by the current award committee, although 2020 winner Zaven Collins qualified under the original criteria.

Trophy 
The main part of the trophy is a block of granite, paying homage to Lombardi's college days at Fordham University as an offensive lineman when his offensive line was referred to as the "Seven Blocks of Granite".

Winners

See also
 Outland Trophy, awarded annually to the best interior lineman in college football
 Rimington Trophy, awarded annually to the best center in college football
 Ted Hendricks Award, awarded annually to the best defensive end in college football
 UPI College Football Lineman of the Year

References

External links
 

College football national player awards
Rotary International
Awards established in 1970